Leira may refer to:

Places

Norway
Leira (river), a river in Innlandet and Akershus counties
Leira or Leiren, a village in Grane municipality, Nordland county
Leira, Innlandet, a village in Nord-Aurdal municipality, Innlandet county
Leira, Trøndelag, a village in Indre Fosen municipality, Trøndelag county
Leira, Ørsta, a village in Ørsta municipality, Møre og Romsdal county

Spain
Leira (river in Galicia), a river in Galicia, Spain

Other
Leira (Forgotten Realms), fictional goddess of the Forgotten Realms
Leira (Loudspeaker), concrete speaker produced by Rauna of Sweden

See also
Leiria, a city and municipality in Portugal